Platform envelopment refers to one platform provider moving into another one's market, combining its own functionality with the target's, to form a multi-platform bundle. The markets which evolve rapidly are rich in enveloping opportunities and the companies in these markets are under the continuous threat of becoming obsolete. Mobile phones used to be a separate market but the boundaries between them and music players are beginning to blur. A stand-alone business when threatened with an envelopment attack has few options but to change the business model or sell off the business to the attacker. RealPlayer was a dominant player in the streaming video business and had created a two sided market out of which the consumers were the subsidized side. The content providers were the money side which paid Real for their streaming software. Microsoft launched an envelopment attack on Real by providing the streaming server software clubbed with their Windows NT operating system. The content providers saw no point in continuing using Real and moved to windows platform threatening the existence of Real. Windows could afford to do so since the provision of such a service boosted their sales of the OS and the mass adoption of the Windows Media Player on the consumer side which was the only compatible player with the windows streaming platform.

Typology of Envelopment Attacks 

The two different networks can be complements, substitutes and functionally unrelated. The relationship between the two networks is the basis on how the attack is launched.

Envelopment of Complements 
A network market consists of several players operating in various adjacent layers. In this kind of attack a player tries to gain a dominant position in the adjacent layer by bundling the services the adjacent layer player provides in its own offerings.

Envelopment of Weak Substitutes 

Price a person is willing to pay for a bundle consisting of two perfect substitutes will be the one which he uses either of them and hence there would be no value for a firm to envelope a platform which acts as a perfect substitute for its own offering. However, there is a value to be created when we have in question a set of weak substitutes.

Envelopment of Unrelated Platforms 

The platforms previously meant for a different usage begin to converge as the common set of users begin to rise. Such is the case with mobile phones and video game devices which were used for distinct purposes but the digital platforms available today have converged all such usages into one.

References 

Supply chain management